David Robinson (born 1964) is a Canadian artist specializing in figurative sculpture. He is best known for dynamic compositions that situate his figures in abstract formal environments.

Early life and education 
Born in Toronto, David Robinson entered the Fine Arts stream in high school specializing in sculpture. He continued his studies at Langara College and became an Honours Graduate in the Sculpture Program at the Ontario College of Art and Design.

Artistic practice 
Robinson's work is an example of contemporary humanist realism that draws on conceptual and metaphysical themes.

Robinson's figures reference classical traditions, but often invert or subvert traditional dynamics.

His early works stirred controversy by combining nudity with Christian themes and imagery.  Robinson's sculptures incorporate a variety of materials ranging from bronze, steel and silver to concrete, mirror and paper. Robinson's works range from small unique and editioned works to large-scale monumental sculpture. Examples of large works are those commissioned by parties such as the Regional Municipality of Wood Buffalo, Polygon Homes, the Four Seasons Hotel Resort in Whistler, the Fort McMurray Airport Authority, Century Group, the Rosewood Hotel Georgia, and Trent University.

Notable works

Windward Calm 
Windward Calm is a kinetic suspended sculpture installed at the Gordon and Leslie Diamond Centre at Vancouver General Hospital in 2018. Robinson was inspired to create the piece while spending time at VGH recovering from a cardiac valve repair. The sculpture hangs from a custom winching system and travels vertically through the 7-storey glass atrium, while rotating in the air currents. The sculpture is the subject of a documentary short film titled "A Windward Calm".

Reflections on the River 
Reflections on the River was commissioned by the Regional Municipality of Wood Buffalo. The municipality engaged in intensive public consultation for both art selection and siting.

Further reading 
 MacGillivray, Sage. What Vancouver's divisive 'Spinning Chandelier'... The Globe and Mail, January 2020
 Fuglie, Gordon L. Levity and Gravity: The Sculpture of David Robinson, Image, Spring 2015
 Prinzing, Debra. Loose Tension, Gray Magazine, No. 21, April 2015
 Wilkinson, Loren & Robinson, Harry. Holy Tensions, CRUX, Spring 2014
 Prescott, Theodore L., A Broken Beauty, Wm. B. Eerdmans Publishing Co., Michigan, 2005. 
 Reynolds, Travis. Welcome to the Revitalized Bronze Age, Calgary Herald, August 2005
 Dobbs, Sarah. A week in the life of artist David Robinson, Vancouver Sun, October 2003
 van Slyke, Bruce. Levitas/Gravitas: The Sculpture of David Robinson, Tracey Lawrence Gallery, 2002. 
 Todd, Douglas. Easter Art That Inspires, Provokes, Vancouver Sun, March 29, 2002
 van Slyke, Bruce. Suspended Belief, Espace, September, 2002
 van Slyke, Bruce. Interval - the conditional monuments of David Robinson, Espace, June 2001
 Scott, Michael. Religious Studies, Vancouver Sun, December 16, 1999
 Gustafson, Paula. Inhabitants, Espace, January, 1998
 Scott, Michael. Cutting Fine Figures, Vancouver Sun, October 8, 1997
 Gustafson, Paula. Nude Everymen Make Revealing Connections, Georgia Straight, June, 1997
 Link, Barry. Naked Introspection, Richmond News, June, 1997
 Kangas, Matthew. David Robinson at Diane Farris, Art in America, October, 1996
 Great Work! An Overview of British Columbia Artists, Melanie Gold Art advisory Ltd., 1996. 
 Bale, Douglas. Young Contemporaries Exhibition, London Free Press, September, 1993
 Dykk, Lloyd. In His Own Image, Vancouver Sun, March, 1993

References 

1964 births
Canadian sculptors
Canadian male sculptors
Living people
OCAD University alumni